HMS Eagle was a 74-gun third rate ship of the line of the Royal Navy, launched on 27 February 1804 at Northfleet.

On 31 March, she was driven ashore and severely damaged at Northfleet. She was taken into dock for repairs. On 11 November 1804, together with Eagle, Africiane, and the hired armed vessels Swift and Agnes, shared in the capture of the Upstalsboom, H.L. De Haase, Master.

Eagle returned to the Downs in early 1814. In January 1815 she was in Chatham dockyard undergoing repair. In 1830 she was reduced to a 50-gun ship. In November 1844 Capt. George B. Martin commissioned her for service on the West Indies and North American station. She was back in Devonport by 1848. In 1860 she was employed by the Coast Guard service at Milford Haven.

She was renamed HMS Eaglet in 1918, when she was the Royal Naval Reserve training centre for North West England. A fire destroyed Eagle in 1926.

Notes

References

Bibliography

Lavery, Brian (2003) The Ship of the Line - Volume 1: The development of the battlefleet 1650–1850. Conway Maritime Press. .

Ships of the line of the Royal Navy
Repulse-class ships of the line
1804 ships
Maritime incidents in 1804
Maritime incidents in 1926